Jon Patrick Newlee (born February 26, 1959) is the head women's basketball coach at the University of Idaho. He previously served for six years as the head women's basketball coach at Idaho State University.

Early life
Son of Chaffey Community College basketball coach Barney Newlee, Jon Newlee was born and raised in Rialto, California. At Eisenhower High School in Rialto, Newlee played basketball and tennis; among his basketball teammates was future NFL Hall of Famer Ronnie Lott. Newlee then attended Chaffey Community College and played two years of basketball before transferring to San Diego State University in 1979. Newlee graduated from San Diego State in 1982 with a bachelor's degree in physical education.

Coaching career
From 1983 to 1986, Newlee was an assistant coach at Saint Mary's.

Newlee got his first head coaching position in 1986 at Southwestern College, a junior college in Chula Vista, California. In three seasons, he turned around its women's basketball program from two wins in his first season to a 22–6 record in the 1988–89 season. Newlee earned Pacific Coast Athletic Conference Coach of the Year honors as a result.

After Southwestern, Newlee returned to the major college ranks as an assistant with  UTSA from 1989 to 1991, SMU from 1991 to 1999 under Rhonda Rompola, and Hawaii from 1999 to 2002 under Vince Goo.

After six seasons as head coach at Idaho State, Newlee became the ninth head coach in University of Idaho women's basketball history on April 15, 2008.

Head coaching record
Source for Idaho State:

Sources for Idaho:

References 

1959 births
Living people
American women's basketball coaches
Basketball coaches from California
Basketball players from California
Hawaii Rainbow Wahine basketball coaches
Idaho State Bengals women's basketball coaches
Idaho Vandals women's basketball coaches
Junior college women's basketball coaches in the United States
Sportspeople from Rialto, California
San Diego State University alumni
SMU Mustangs women's basketball coaches
Chaffey Panthers men's basketball players
American men's basketball players
Point guards